Bert Hawkins (29 September 1923 – 21 June 2002) was an English professional footballer who played as a centre-forward in the Football League for Bristol City, West Ham United and Queens Park Rangers.

After starting his career at Bristol Rovers, Hawkins joined Bristol City in 1949. He joined Bath City in February 1950, making his Southern League debut against Weymouth, and his home debut on 4 March 1950 against Gloucester City. He was retained for the 1950–51 season, and was signed by West Ham United on 31 August 1951 for £2,750 (with a proportion of the fee going to previous club Bristol City), as a replacement for the injured Bill Robinson. A day later, he scored on his Hammers debut, a 1–1 draw against Hull City. He totalled 15 goals in 32 Second Division appearances for West Ham in the 1951–52 season, and also made three FA Cup appearances for the club.

After sustaining an injury during pre-season, he scored his only other goal for West Ham in a 3–1 home win against Brentford on 1 November 1952, and played one further game in 1952–53 before moving to Queens Park Rangers. He then played for Cheltenham Town during the 1954–55 season.

References

1923 births
2002 deaths
Footballers from Bristol
English footballers
Association football forwards
Bristol Rovers F.C. players
Bristol City F.C. players
Bath City F.C. players
West Ham United F.C. players
Queens Park Rangers F.C. players
Cheltenham Town F.C. players
Southern Football League players
English Football League players